Roe Island Lighthouse was a lighthouse on Roe Island on the east end of Suisun Bay, California.

History

In the 1900s, a second dwelling similar to the lighthouse without the lantern were built adjacent to the lighthouse.

On 17 July 1944, the Port Chicago disaster occurred, damaging the lighthouse. Two ships, Quinault Victory and E. A. Bryan, were being loaded with tons of munitions. At approximately 10:20 pm, there was an enormous explosion. More than 300 men, both ships, two Coast Guard vessels and much of the train were destroyed.

With changes in the shipping waterways in the area the light, was no longer needed anymore so it was decommissioned in 1945 and sold.  An 11 August 1944 Coast Guard report noted that the station: "consists of the light, with two keepers, with dwellings, outhouses, power house, water supply tanks, wharf, walkways, boat harbor and boatways.  No fog signal is maintained.  Electric current for the light and quarters is generated at the station.  Water supply is from rain collected from the building roofs, augmented by supply pumped in from the tenders."

It was sold to a private family. The family used the station as a summer home until a fire destroyed it.

See also

 List of lighthouses in the United States

References

External links

 

Lighthouses completed in 1891
Lighthouses in the San Francisco Bay Area
History of Solano County, California
1891 establishments in California
Transportation buildings and structures in Solano County, California